The Autonomous Port of Paris (French: "Port autonome de Paris") is a public institution of the France set up in 1970. Its mission is to develop waterway traffic and port activity by creating, maintaining and handling the commercial operation of 70 sites in Ile-de-France. It is the second largest inland port in Europe after Duisburg.

References

Ports and harbours of France
Autonomous and independent ports
1970 establishments in France